Ganzfeld (German for "complete field") is a particular phenomenon of visual perception.  The term is used most commonly in relationship to:

 Ganzfeld effect, the psychological result of staring at an actual Ganzfeld
 Ganzfeld experiment, a technique in parapsychology